A market house is a covered space historically used as a marketplace

Market House may also refer to:

England
Winster Market House
Market House (Rothwell, Northamptonshire)
Market House (Somerton, England)

Ireland
Market House, Monaghan, Republic of Ireland
Market House, Newtownards, Northern Ireland

United States
 Old Market House (Galena, Illinois), listed on the National Register of Historic Places (NRHP)
 Market House (Paducah, Kentucky), listed on the NRHP in Kentucky
Paducah Market House District, Paducah, Kentucky, listed on the NRHP in Kentucky
 Market House (Omaha), Nebraska
 Market House (Oswego, New York), NRHP-listed
Market Hall and Sheds, Charleston, South Carolina, NRHP-listed
 Market House (Fayetteville, North Carolina), NRHP-listed
Market House Square District, Fayetteville, North Carolina, listed on the NRHP in North Carolina
 Market House (Providence, Rhode Island), NRHP-listed
Old Market House Museum, Goliad, TX, listed on the NRHP in Texas

See also 
City Market (disambiguation)
Market Houses in the Republic of Ireland
List of Irish towns with a Market House
Market hall (disambiguation)